Love Life or Lovelife may refer to:

Organizations
loveLife South Africa, a youth focused HIV prevention initiative in South Africa
Love Life, a campaign started by Blackie Chen and Christine Fan to benefit children suffering from cancer

Film and television 
Lovelife, a 1996 romantic comedy film
Love Life (2006 film), directed by Damion Dietz
Love Life (2007 film), also known as Liebesleben, Israeli/German film directed by Maria Schrader based on a novel by Zeruya Shalev
Love Life (2022 film), a Japanese drama
Love Life (British TV series), a British series on ITV
True Love (TV series), a 2012 BBC series, previously called Love Life
Love Life (American TV series), an American series on HBO Max

Music 
Love Life (musical), a 1948 musical by Kurt Weill and Alan Jay Lerner
A short-lived band that became Celebration

Albums

Love Life (Hitomi album), a 2000 album by Japanese singer Hitomi 
Love Life 2, a 2009 sequel album by Hitomi 
Lovelife (album), a 1996 album by shoegaze band Lush
Love Life (Berlin album), a 1984 album by American new wave band Berlin
Love Life (Tamia album), a 2015 album by Canadian singer Tamia
 Love Life (Brenda Russell album), a 1981 album by American singer Brenda Russell

Songs
"Love Life" (song), a song by Pet Shop Boys, 2010 covered by Alcazar
"LoveLife", a 2011 song by Kate Ryan
"Love Life", a song by The Rutles parodying "All You Need Is Love" by The Beatles
"Love Life", a song by Netsky
"Lovelife", a song by Take That from III

See also
Love of Life, an American soap opera
"Love the Life", a 1992 song by Bass Culture
We Love Life, a 2001 album by Pulp
Sex life